Some Aspects of Water is a live album by pianist Geri Allen recorded in 1996 in Denmark at concerts celebrating her award of the 1996 Jazzpar Prize and released on the Storyville label.

Reception

Allmusic awarded the album 4½ stars, stating, "Throughout the date, Geri Allen shows why she is one of post-bop's top stars. Highly recommended". JazzTimes stated "As an example both of Allen's sense of longer form and of larger ensembles, it is interesting-but frankly, its wholeness and beauty transcend such considerations". The Penguin Guide to Jazz criticized Allen's hesitant playing of standards, and thought some of her own pieces were patchy.

Track listing
All compositions by Geri Allen except where noted.
 "Feed the Fire" - 10:53	
 "A Beautiful Friendship" (Donald Kahn, Stanley Styne) - 9:34	
 "Old Folks" (Dedette Lee Hill, Willard Robison) - 9:30	
 "Smooth Attitudes" (Jens Winther) - 8:02	
 "Some Aspects of Water" - 18:51	
 "Skin" - 9:43

Personnel 
Geri Allen - piano
Palle Danielsson  - bass 
Lenny White - drums
Johnny Coles - flugelhorn (tracks 3-5)
Henrik Bolberg Pedersen - trumpet, flugelhorn (tracks 4 & 5)
Kjeld Ipsen - trombone (tracks 4 & 5)
Axel Windfeld - tuba (tracks 4 & 5)
Michael Hove - alto saxophone, flute, clarinet (tracks 4 & 5)
Uffe Markussen - tenor saxophone, soprano saxophone, bass clarinet, flute (tracks 4 & 5)

References 

1997 live albums
Geri Allen live albums
Storyville Records live albums
Instrumental albums